Ananda Chandra is an Indian film director, working in the Telugu industry. Anand has worked in movies like Aasha Encounter (Disha Encounter) and Murder. Disha Encounter which was Directed by Anand Chandra, starring Srikanth Iyengar and Sonia Akhula in the lead roles. The story revolves around the horrific rape and murder of a young woman in Hyderabad. Ram Gopal Varma’s Murder is all set to hit the screen on 24 December 2020, which was directed by Ananda Chandra starring Sahithi Avancha as daughter, Keshav Deepak as Father, and Gayatri Bhargavi in lead roles. The film is based on the murder of Pranay in the Miryalaguda region of Telangana when he married Amrutha, daughter of Maruthi Rao.

References 

Living people
Telugu film directors
Year of birth missing (living people)
Place of birth missing (living people)